Andrew "Andy" Newell (born November 30, 1983) is an American former cross-country skier. He began competing on international level in 2001 and debuted in the World Cup in the 2003–04 season. In 2020 Newell launched is online coaching platform Nordic Team Solutions. He is currently the Bridger Ski Foundation Pro Team coach in Bozeman, Montana

Career
His best individual finish at the FIS Nordic World Ski Championships was fifth in the sprint at the 2007 championships in Sapporo. Newell's best individual finish at the Winter Olympics was 16th in the sprint at Turin in 2006. In March, 2006, Newell reached a third place in a World Cup sprint race in Changchun, China. This podium position was the first in just over 20 years for an American Nordic skier. Newell has a total of twenty one individual sprint victories at various levels since 2001, including his first National Championship in January, 2007, at Houghton, MI.

Results in 2007–08 season include: 2008 US National Sprint Champion, 4th place World Cup Kuusamo Finland, 2nd place World Cup Lahti Finland.

Andrew Newell was born in Shaftsbury, Vermont. He attended the Stratton Mountain School for several years, where his career as a ski racer began to flourish. After completing his high school degree and some post-grad work at Stratton, Newell went on to join the US Ski Team, which he still competes for today.

He also does cinematography as a hobby, and is the owner of a film company called 'X Ski Films.' Newell is known as one of the most talented persons on cross-country skis, as he demonstrates as a star in his own films. Among Newell's most noteworthy accomplishments in the XSki world are huge backflips on his skinny skis, 720's, and a radar-clocking (by the Vermont State Police) of over 50 mph.

It was announced on January 19, 2010, that Newell had qualified for the 2010 Winter Olympics where he earned his best finish of ninth in the team sprint.

He is represented by Ken Sowles Athletes Management and Sport Promotion.

In 2013 Newell founded the Organization Athletes For Action, an Environmental organization focused on using professional athletes to bring attention to climate change. Some of his Climate Change Op-Eds were featured in The New York Times and USA Today. Newell also works with the environmental organization Protect Our Winters and regularly speaks on behalf of sustainable practices and urging world leaders to politically take action against climate change.

Newell retired after the 2019–20 season.

Cross-country skiing results
All results are sourced from the International Ski Federation (FIS).

Olympic Games

World Championships

World Cup

Season standings

Individual podiums
 3 podiums – (3 )

References

External links
 
 
 
 
 
 
 NBCOlympics.com announcement of the 2010 cross-country skiing team. – accessed 20 January 2010.
 Stratton Mountain School
 Arluck Promotions | Athlete Management – Andrew Newell

1984 births
Living people
American male cross-country skiers
Olympic cross-country skiers of the United States
Cross-country skiers at the 2006 Winter Olympics
Cross-country skiers at the 2010 Winter Olympics
Cross-country skiers at the 2014 Winter Olympics
Cross-country skiers at the 2018 Winter Olympics
Tour de Ski skiers
Sportspeople from Vermont
21st-century American people